"Home for My Heart" is a song by British recording artists ArrDee and Cat Burns. It was released as a single on 9 March 2023, through Island Records and Universal Music Operations Limited.

Background
"Home for My Heart" was written by ArrDee, Cat Burns, Jake Gosling, Lauren Keen, Matthew Brettle, WhyJay, AOD and actor and writer Kwame Kwei-Armah; production was by Gosling, LiTek, WhyJay and AOD.

Release
On 9 March 2023, ArrDee and Cat Burns released "Home For My Heart", which saw the former adopting a different sound to what he has released previously.

Music video
The official music video, directed by Najeeb Tarazi, was released the same day.

Chart performance
After three days of release, the Official Charts Company predicted "Home for my Heart" would debut at number 36 on the UK Singles Top 100. "Home for my Heart" debuted at number 35 on the UK singles chart on 17 March 2023. It debuted at number 83 on the Irish singles chart. and number 23 on the Official New Zealand Music Chart.

Charts and certifications

References

2023 singles
2023 songs
Island Records singles